Achaea leucopasa is a species of moth of the family Erebidae first described by Francis Walker in 1858. It is found on Madagascar and Réunion.

References

Achaea (moth)
Moths of Madagascar
Erebid moths of Africa
Moths described in 1858